Francis Nelson Blount (May 21, 1918 – August 31, 1967) was president and founder of Blount Seafood Corporation and the founder of Steamtown, USA, the Monadnock, Steamtown & Northern Railroad, and the Green Mountain Railroad. A millionaire and a railroad enthusiast, Blount's collection of vintage steam locomotives and rail cars—originally based in New England—was one of the largest ever assembled and still remains the cornerstone of the modern-day Steamtown National Historic Site.

Biography 
Francis Nelson Blount was born May 21, 1918 in Warren, Rhode Island to Willis and Ruth Blount. Willis had established an ice company in neighboring Barrington in 1919. As a child, Nelson (as he would be called) and brother Luther assisted their father at the family business. When he was not doing so, Nelson frequented the New York, New Haven and Hartford Railroad yard located near his home. It was here that his deep appreciation for railroads, and particularly steam locomotives, was formed.

On May 23, 1933, just after his fifteenth birthday, Blount skipped school to see the famous British steamer, Royal Scot, on exhibition in Providence, Rhode Island en route to the Chicago World's Fair. There he happened upon schoolmate Frederick H. Richardson, a fellow railroad enthusiast, and the two became lifelong friends. Richardson would later serve as an employee and business partner for Blount in his future endeavors. The two co-authored one of the first popular railfan books on the subject, Along the Iron Trail, in 1938. They frequently visited the two-foot narrow gauge railroads of Maine, particularly the Sandy River & Rangeley Lakes Railroad and the Bridgton & Harrison Railroad. The complete abandonment of the Sandy River & Rangeley Lakes Railroad in 1935, and the boys’ helplessness to stop it, had a deep emotional impact on them. They began to discuss dreams of saving the memory of steam railroading.

Fred Richardson enlisted in the Coast Guard with the arrival of the United States' involvement in the World War II. Nelson had wanted to enlist in the Navy, yet a leg injury and a broken back suffered when falling off a wharf had triggered a return of his childhood undulant fever in 1939, and he was declared unfit for service. Instead of serving in the military, Blount married Ruth Palmer, whose mother had coincidentally been high school classmates with Nelson’s parents, on October 10, 1942. The two began a family with Blount supplying ice to the many military camps in the Rhode Island and Cape Cod areas. 

Blount's family had been involved in the shellfish industry since the 1880s. The 1938 hurricane devastated the oyster business in Rhode Island's Narragansett Bay. Nelson Blount, along with his uncle Byron, helped introduce the bay quahog (a hard-shell clam) as a source of protein. After trials the quahog was approved for military consumption, and demand exploded. In 1943, Blount purchased the former Narragansett Oyster Company for $9,856 and had it renamed the Narragansett Bay Packing Company. After the war in 1946, he consolidated several smaller shellfish firms to found Blount Seafood Corporation, which provided chopped clams to soup manufacturers throughout the United States, including Campbell Soup. His family still owns and controls the company. Upon returning from the Coast Guard, Fred Richardson joined Blount at the seafood company.

In the 1950s, Blount relocated his family from Rhode Island to the Monadnock region of New Hampshire, settling in Dublin, New Hampshire at what he called "Staghead Farm".

Locomotive Collection 

Blount used some of the money that he made in the seafood industry to purchase the narrow gauge Edaville Railroad in South Carver, Massachusetts in the mid-1950s. The Edaville Railroad had narrow gauge engines from Maine, but Blount soon began acquiring standard gauge steam locomotives and cars, in part to save a vanishing technological heritage. Some locomotives were initially displayed at Engine City, a part of Pleasure Island amusement park near Wakefield, Massachusetts. Space constraints soon forced Blount to look for a new home for his collection, and he purchased an engine house and railroad yard in 1960 from the Boston and Maine Railroad in North Walpole, New Hampshire, with equipment arriving there in late 1960. By 1964 his collection on display alone in North Walpole consisted of 25 steam locomotives from the United States and Canada, 10 other locomotives, and 25 pieces of rolling stock; one of the largest collections of antique steam locomotives in the United States.

Monadnock, Steamtown & Northern Railroad 

Subsequently, on April 26, 1961, Blount and his associates founded a separate standard-gauge tourist excursion railroad, the Monadnock, Steamtown & Northern, to provide the steam train rides.  Blount had hoped to operate on the Boston & Maine's Cheshire Branch between North Walpole and Keene, but B&M labor issues led to the first MS&N trains briefly operating on the Claremont and Concord Railway in the summer of 1961. In 1962, Blount's MS&N finally operated between Keene and Gilboa while he discussed a state-funded Steamtown, U.S.A. opening in Keene. The MS&N later operated out of North Walpole in 1963, and in Vermont between 1964 and 1967. The MS&N ceased operations just after Blount's untimely death, and was dissolved in August 1971.

Steamtown, U.S.A. 

Blount envisioned his collection as the cornerstone to a grand museum at North Walpole, to be called "Steamtown, U.S.A". He first planned to open this museum at his North Walpole facility, but soon diverted his attention to Keene to allow for a larger museum space. Blount hoped to commit the state of New Hampshire to fund the museum's construction and offered 20 of his steam locomotives as an incentive; meanwhile, he would control the Monadnock, Steamtown & Northern, which was to be the separate excursion operator on the B&M Cheshire Branch. Local and state support was initially strong, but delays on a sale of the Cheshire Branch and some negative press in the state led to the newly-elected state government killing the Keene plans in early 1963. Promised support for Steamtown from the state of New Hampshire never materialized, leading to yet another move back to North Walpole in 1963. This was the first year that the collection was open to the public (as opposed to just MS&N train rides), and soon it was decided that the North Walpole site was too small for the many visitors who came. 

With state interest waning, Blount established the "Steamtown Foundation for the Preservation of Steam and Railroad Americana", a non-profit charitable, educational organization to acquire his collection and operate the museum. This also allowed donations of locomotives and rolling stock to be accepted, such as Union Pacific 4012 in 1964. Steamtown U.S.A. opened for the first time as a museum at North Walpole in 1963, and the MS&N ran excursions again over the Cheshire Branch—this time from North Walpole to Westmoreland. Blount also entered into talks with the state of Vermont to assume control of abandoned former Rutland Railroad tracks and property between Bellows Falls and Rutland. This provided a safe home for the Monadnock, Steamtown & Northern excursions and ample room for the Steamtown, U.S.A. museum to develop. Between 1964 and 1966, Steamtown, U.S.A. began to move to Riverside. Blount envisioned a 40-stall roundhouse, a station, yard tracks, steamboat operations on the Connecticut River, and a model New England village complete with a country church and electric street railway. In 1964 and 1965, Blount established the Green Mountain Railroad to provide freight service to the beleaguered on-line customers and employ his excursion staff in the off season. 

By 1967 Blount planned to distance himself from the business affairs of the Steamtown Foundation, hoping to find a replacement as chairman and focus mainly on being a steam locomotive engineer. His sudden death on August 31, 1967 was unexpected and, without his personal funds, Steamtown fell on hard times. Nearly all of his development plans for the site in Vermont went unfulfilled and the harsh winters helped speed deterioration of much of the collection. Steamtown moved to Scranton, Pennsylvania in 1984 and soon after went bankrupt. In 1986, the federal government stepped in and established the Steamtown National Historic Site to save the collection; the park officially opened in 1995.

Religion 
In the 1960s, Blount became a devoted evangelical Christian.  A biography entitled The Man from Steamtown was written by James R. Adair in 1967 which focuses heavily on his spiritual life.  Blount sought to preserve an evangelical Christian legacy by donating his Dublin, New Hampshire homestead and its surrounding farm buildings, pastures, and forest to a group of committed Christian educators in 1964, headed by Mel Moody, who worked together to develop Staghead Farm (as it was then called) into Dublin Christian Academy, a combined elementary school and secondary boarding school.

Death 

After operating a day of steam excursions on August 31, 1967, Blount was flying from Steamtown to his home in Dublin when his Maule Rocket, a new plane with only thirty hours of flying time, crashed near Marlborough, New Hampshire during an emergency landing caused by fuel exhaustion. Nelson was an experienced flyer and had owned many aircraft; he had performed a pre-flight check and is believed to have planned to stop at Keene Airport for refueling. Around noon the next day, September 1, two local girls—Dawn Antilla, age 14, and Laurie St. John, age 13—came across the field and ran immediately to a nearby home to call the police.

As the plane descended its rear landing gear had buckled. The plane had bounced up and continued flying for  down the field and into a large pine tree at the crest of the clearing. Dr. James Ballou, Cheshire County medical referee, later found no evidence of a heart attack or other illness. The possibility of major mechanical issues on the brand-new plane was investigated and ruled out.

Blount's funeral was held September 4, 1967, at 1:30 p.m. in the National Guard Armory in Peterborough, New Hampshire, just next door to Dublin. Nearly 500 people turned out to pay their respects. Following the funeral, Nelson was interred in Dublin Cemetery.

References

External links 
 History of Blount Seafood
 The Well Known and Lesser Known Trains of Pleasure Island
 Steamtown National Historic Site
 History of Nelson Blount & Dublin Christian Academy

1918 births
1967 deaths
20th-century American businesspeople
Accidental deaths in New Hampshire
American food company founders
American people in rail transportation
Aviators killed in aviation accidents or incidents in the United States
Victims of aviation accidents or incidents in 1967